Ibrahimpatti Near Koth, Ballia is a village in Ballia district of Uttar Pradesh, India. As of 2011 Census of India, this village has a population of 1,674.

A former Prime Minister of India, Chandra Shekhar, was a native of Ibrahimpatti. Imbranhim Patti's nearest railway station is kirihrapur.

References

Villages in Ballia district